Farangiz Khojieva (born 8 May 2000) is an Uzbekistani judoka. She competed in the women's 63 kg event at the 2020 Summer Olympics held in Tokyo, Japan.

She won a medal at the 2021 World Judo Championships.

References

External links
 

2000 births
Living people
Uzbekistani female judoka
Judoka at the 2020 Summer Olympics
Olympic judoka of Uzbekistan
21st-century Uzbekistani women